Olaseni Abdul-Jelili "Shane" Lawal (born October 8, 1986) is a retired Nigerian-American professional basketball player. He played the center position.

College career
Lawal played college basketball for three years at Oakland University, with the Oakland Golden Grizzlies, before moving to Wayne State University, where he played with the Wayne State Warriors during the 2008–09 season.

Professional career
Lawal went undrafted at the 2009 NBA draft. For the 2009–10 season, he signed with Al Arabi Doha of the Qatari Basketball League.

For the 2010–11 season, he moved to Spain and signed with CB Guadalajara of the LEB Plata. In April 2011, he moved to the Libyan League club Al-Ahli Benghazi for the rest of the season.

In July 2011, he signed with CB Clavijo of the LEB Oro.

On August 5, 2012, he signed with Tezenis Verona of the Italian Legadue Basket. He led the league in rebounding (13.6 rpg) and in blocking shots (1.8 bpg) during the 2012-13 campaign.

On July 29, 2013, Lawal signed a one-year deal with BC Astana of Kazakhstan. With Astana, he won the Kazakh League and Cup in the 2013–14 season.

On July 31, 2014, Lawal signed a one-year deal with the Italian club Dinamo Sassari. With the Italians, he won the season's League, Cup and Supercup. In Euroleague play, Lawal averaged 9 points and 7,3 rebounds in ten games for Sassari that season.

Lawal has also competed for Overseas Elite in The Basketball Tournament. He was a center on the 2015 team that won TBT's $1 million prize.

On July 20, 2015, Lawal signed a two-year deal with the Spanish club FC Barcelona Lassa. On May 12, 2017, he parted ways with Barcelona.

On August 26, 2017, Lawal signed with Italian club Sidigas Avellino. His last stop in professional basketball was Homenetmen Beirut in 2019.

National team
Lawal was Nigeria's top performer at the AfroBasket 2015 , averaging 19.6 efficiency, and 9.0 rebounds per game, as the West Africans clinched their first-ever continental championship in Tunisia.

Coaching career 
Before moving to Beirut for his last stint as a professional basketball player in February 2019, he had served as a volunteer assistant coach at John Glenn High School in Westland, Michigan. In 2019, he was appointed as head coach of the girls' basketball team at Renaissance High School in Detroit.

Career statistics

EuroLeague

|-
| style="text-align:left;"| 2014–15
| style="text-align:left;"| Sassari
| 10 || 8 || 23.0 || .617 || .000 || .471 || 7.3 || 1.4 || 1.5 || 1.5 || 9.0 || 15.0
|-
| style="text-align:left;"| 2015–16
| style="text-align:left;"| Barcelona
| 17 || 0 || 14.9 || .673 || .000 || .594 || 4.1 || .6 || .5 || .7 || 5.2 || 7.7
|- class="sortbottom"
| style="text-align:left;"| Career
| style="text-align:left;"|
| 27 || 8 || 17.9 || .643 || .000 || .530 || 5.3 || .9 || .9 || 1.0 || 6.6 || 10.4

References

External links
Shane Lawal at acb.com 
Shane Lawal at fiba.com
Shane Lawal at euroleague.net 
Shane Lawal at legabasket.it 
Shane Lawal at realgm.com

1986 births
Living people
American expatriate basketball people in Italy
American expatriate basketball people in Kazakhstan
American expatriate basketball people in Qatar
American expatriate basketball people in Spain
American people of Yoruba descent
American men's basketball players
Basketball players at the 2016 Summer Olympics
BC Astana players
Centers (basketball)
Dinamo Sassari players
FC Barcelona Bàsquet players
Lega Basket Serie A players
Liga ACB players
Nigerian emigrants to the United States
Nigerian expatriate basketball people in Italy
Nigerian expatriate basketball people in Spain
Nigerian men's basketball players
Oakland Golden Grizzlies men's basketball players
Olympic basketball players of Nigeria
Power forwards (basketball)
Scaligera Basket Verona players
Sportspeople from Abeokuta
Wayne State Warriors men's basketball players
Yoruba sportspeople